Ruettiger 'Rory' Jacob (born 11 October 1983 in Oulart, County Wexford) is an Irish sportsperson. He plays hurling with his local club Oulart–The Ballagh and was a member of the Wexford senior inter-county team from 2002 to 2015.  Both his father Mick and his brother Michael also played for Wexford. He was captain of the Wexford team for 2008.

Career statistics

Club

References

1983 births
Living people
Oulart-the-Ballagh hurlers
Wexford inter-county hurlers